Minott may refer to:

Rodney O'Gliasain Kennedy-Minott, (1928–2004), American diplomat, Democratic Party activist, history professor at Stanford University
Roger Minott Sherman (1773–1844), the youngest of six children of Rev. Josiah Sherman (Princeton College - 1754)
Sugar Minott (1956–2010), Jamaican reggae singer, producer and sound-system operator
William Minott House, historic house in Portland, Maine

See also
Menott
Minett
Minette (disambiguation)
Minotti